The United States Post Office-Baxley, Georgia on Tippins Street in Baxley in Appling County, Georgia is a Colonial Revival-style post office built in 1935–1936.  It was listed on the National Register of Historic Places in 2000.

It is a small one-story post office which is "similar in size, scale, materials, and architectural style to many of the other
approximately sixty-five post offices built in Georgia" during the 1930s.  It is one of the "vast majority of post offices built in Georgia during this period [which] were designed in the Colonial Revival style."

It is now used for the magistrate court.

References

External links

Post office buildings on the National Register of Historic Places in Georgia (U.S. state)
Colonial Revival architecture in Georgia (U.S. state)
Government buildings completed in 1935
Buildings and structures in Appling County, Georgia
National Register of Historic Places in Appling County, Georgia